Gukpung 81(國風81) was a South Korean government hosted festival in 1981.

The Fifth Republic of South Korea tried to reduce the violent image formed by Coup d'état of December Twelfth, Coup d'état of May Seventeenth and Gwangju massacre by Gukpung 81 Festival. During Gukpung 81 Festival, Chungmu gimbap became popular in South Korea.

See also
List of festivals in South Korea
List of festivals in Asia

External links

1981 in South Korea
Cultural festivals in South Korea
1981 festivals in South Korea
Arts festivals in South Korea